Elizabeth A. Kelly CBE (born 1951) is a British professor and director of the Child and Woman Abuse Studies Unit (CWASU), London Metropolitan University, former head of the, now defunct, Women's National Commission, and co-chair, along with Marai Larasi, of the End Violence Against Women Coalition.

Career 
Kelly has written numerous papers and articles relating to violence against women and children, and has been a guest editor on the journal Child Abuse Review.

Her review of why so many alleged rapists go unprosecuted and unconvicted, which she conducted for the Crown Prosecution Service Inspectorate, stated, "that at each stage of the legal process, stereotypes and prejudices play a part in decision-making".

In her book "The Hidden Gender of Law", Kelly argues "there is no clear distinction between consensual sex and rape, but a continuum of pressure, threat, coercion and force". She claims that all women experience sexual violence at some points in their lives.

Kelly's publication "Surviving Sexual Violence" defines sexual violence as including "any physical, visual, verbal or sexual act that is experienced by the woman or girl, at the time or later, as a threat, invasion or assault, that has the effect of hurting her or degrading her and/or takes away her ability to control". Such a definition was criticised by Wendy McElroy, describing it as "disastrously subjective" also noting "regret is not a benchmark of consent".

Kelly was awarded the CBE in the 2000 New Years Honours, for services to combating violence against women and children.

Recognition
She was recognized as one of the BBC's 100 women of 2017.

Bibliography

Books

Chapters in books 
  
  
  
 
 
 
  
  Pdf.

Journal articles 
 
  Pdf.
 
 
 
  Pdf.

Papers

For the CWASU 
 
  Pdf. 
 
  Online.  Pdf. 
  Pdf from Zero Tolerance.
  Pdf. 
  End of award report to the ESRC.
  Details online. 
 
  Online. Pdf.
 
 
 
 
 
 
  Pdf. 
  Pdf.
  Pdf. Funded by the ESRC.
  Pdf.  Funded by Equal Opportunities Commission and the Roddick Foundation.
  Pdf. 
  Pdf.
 
   Pdf. Final report, pdf. Funded by the European Commission Daphne II Programme.
 
  Pdf. 
  Pdf.
  Unpublished report, parts of which are quoted in this pdf.
  Pdf. 
  Pdf. A report commissioned for the Office of the Children’s Commissioner's Inquiry into Child Sexual Exploitation in Gangs and Groups.
  Pdf.

Home Office 
  Pdf.
  Pdf. 
  Pdf.
  Pdf.
  Pdf.
  Online. Pdf.
  Online. Pdf. Evaluation of Domestic Violence Protection Orders (DVPOs) for the International Crime and Policing Conference 2015.

Other papers 
  A literature review ahead of report commissioned by HMCPSI and published the following year. Pdf.
  Commissioned by HMCPSI to inform their thematic review into the investigation and prosecution of cases involving allegations of rape.
  Pdf.
 
  Online. 
  Pdf.
  Pdf. 
   Pdf.
   Pdf.
  Pdf.
  Pdf.

References

External links 
 Liz Kelly, London Metropolitan University

1951 births
Living people
Academics of London Metropolitan University
British charity and campaign group workers
Commanders of the Order of the British Empire
Place of birth missing (living people)
Women's studies academics
BBC 100 Women